Thotapalli is a village in Garugubilli mandal, Parvathipuram Manyam district, Andhra Pradesh, India.

References

Villages in Parvathipuram Manyam district